Frederick Ruple (September 19, 1871 - May 23, 1938) was a 20th-century Swiss-American painter, primarily of portraits. He was commissioned to paint Confederate Civil War battle scenes and murals. At times Ruple lived in Arkansas and Oklahoma where he traveled to study American Indians and early settlement in the Midwest. The Oklahoma Land Run of 1889 inspired Ruple to create his most famous painting "The Spirit of '89".

As a painter, Ruple took commission jobs that came from builders and decorators who hired him to paint murals and designs on public buildings. The work he did along these lines was among the most prominent in America.

Early life 

Frederick Ruple was born on September 19, 1871, in Unterhallau, a part of Hallau, in the canton of Schaffhausen, Switzerland. His parents were butcher Hermann Rupli and Barbara Neukomm. 
 
Hermann Rupli wandered off to America without his family on May 24, 1872. Hermann and Barbara were divorced on November 12, 1874, according to Schaffhausen court records. Frederick was 3 years old at that time.

Frederick's mother relocated to Basel in 1885, when Frederick was 14 years old. Barbara Neukomm was registered in the address book of Basel in 1885 at the address Mattweg 53rd, from 1886 to 1891. She worked as a housekeeper at the address 30 Greifengasse, Basel. When Frederick Ruple was 14 he became an apprentice to an artificial limb manufacturer. In the summer of 1887, he attended the General school. When he was 16 years old he lived in Spores Gasse 16, Basel. He was in training as a photographer with Emil Gassler, at Aeschenvorstadt 42. On Gassler's poster it says in German: "Photographien in allen grossen portrait in oel"; in English this is: "Photographs in all sizes, portraits in oil".

In 1891, at age 19, Ruple immigrated with his mother to America. Around this time, his last name changed from Rupli to Ruple.

In the United States he first lived with his mother's sister in Cincinnati. During this time, an art dealer saw his drawings and ordered a copy of a photograph in colors, which was the first such piece of work sold in that country.
 
Ruple, while still a young man, moved to Little Rock to become the protégé of Mrs. James P. Eagle, wife of the state's governor at the time, and his work of painting portraits began. Governor Eagle, General Forest and other prominent men of the state sat for him.

Personal life 

After three years in America he married Almira C. King on December 25, 1894, in Belmont, Ohio.  Almira was born June 1873, in West Virginia.

The 1900 U.S. Federal Census stated that Frederick (28) and Almira (26) lived in Lonoke, Arkansas; had been married for six years; and had a three-year-old son, Frederick D. Ruple. The boy was born on November 6, 1897, in New York in Cincinnati, Ohio.

The 1910 stated that Frederick and Almira had 2 sons and a daughter: Frederick D. (13 and born in Ohio); George W. (6 and born in Arkansas); and Almira C. (3 years old and born in Pennsylvania) living in their home in Ruddell township, Independence, Arkansas.

The 1920 Census stated that the couple were renting a home in Batesville, Independence, Arkansas.

An obituary in Southwest Times Record on March 7, 1925, reported that Almira (Mollie) (King) Ruple died March 5, 1925, in her home at 600 South 2 Twenty-First Street, while her family survived.

The 1930 stated that Frederick was by then married to Mildred Ruple (age 31), and that they lived with their son Robert Ruple (2) and daughter Mary Louise (six months) in Fayetteville, Arkansas. Fred and Myra also lived with them.

Frederick had his Fayetteville studio on the public square, along with a private painting school. Many of his paintings hung in private homes. Mary Louise attended Helen Dunlop Memorial School at Winslow before attending the University of Arkansas. George died from tuberculosis on September 13, 1934.

In 1936, Frederick Ruple resided at 2647 N Norfolk avenue in Tulsa, OK, and by 1938 he lived at 1505 S Columbia, Tulsa, OK, where he battled with poor health and died from a heart attack on May 23, 1938, in his house.

Major works

The Spirit of '89 
The painting depicts the initial moments of the opening of Oklahoma for homesteading in 1889. The painting's central figure is Major Gordon W. Lillie (Pawnee Bill, the famous scout), who can be seen in his full scout outfit leading the run. The painting measures 9 feet by 12 feet (with frame).

Lew Wentz, a businessman from Ponca City, bought "The Spirit of '89". He presented it to Ponca City, which in turn gave it to the Oklahoma Historical Society, in whose building it now hangs.

Civil war paintings 

Ruple's paintings from the US Civil War include depictions of Confederates battle scenes. His "Battle of Paris 1862" depicts a skirmish near Forrest Heights on the west side of the city, on March 11, 1862. The painting "General Nathan Bedford Forrest" depicts the Confederate war hero at the Battle at Bogler's Creek, Alabama, mounted on King Phillip with his sword drawn, surrounded by federals.

Ruple depicts the Battle of Brice's Crossroads, fought on June 10, 1864, in his painting "Edmund Winchester Rucker". The work shows General Forrest mounted on King Phillip, his sword sheathed, surrounded by his men.

Other major works 

The painting "Tribal Camp Fire" hangs in the John Burroughs school building in Tulsa, OK.

While in Fayetteville he painted portraits of Dr. H. D. Wood and Major D. R. Davidson.

Portraits 

Most of Ruple's fame came from celebrity portraits in Arkansas and Oklahoma, such as Confederate Generals and known politicians. His subjects included former United States Senator Robert L. Owen of Oklahoma; Supreme Court Judge U.M. Rose of Little Rock, Ark.; the father of Senator Joe Robinson; J.S. Parks and E. B. Kinsworthy, former Attorney-General of Arkansas; Mrs. Walter Ferguson, newspaper columnist; her husband, Arkansas Senator Caraway.; Judge Thomas of Muskogee, and William Busy of McAlester. William Busy of McAlester

In Batesville, Fayetteville and Fort Smith, Arkansas a number of his portraits survive.

Murals 

Paul Heerwagen was an interior decorator who used Frederick Ruple to paint the four murals in the Capital Building in Little Rock, murals in the Strand Theater in Shreveport, LA, and murals of the Sahara Shrine Temple at Pine Bluff.

Gallery

References

Census documents 
 Federal Census 1900, Fred Ruple Lonoke, Lonoke, Arkansas. Printed page 42. Dwelling 188, Fam No. 181, Roll: 67; Page: 9A; Enumeration District: 0087; FHL microfilm 1240067. Accessed on Ancestry.com.
 Federal Census 1910, Fredric Rouple [Ruple]. Ruddell township, Independence, Arkansas. Source Ancestry. com 1910 United States Federal Census Place Ruddell, Independence, Arkansas; Roll: T624_52; Page: 15B; Enumeration District: 0040; FHL microfilm: 1374065.
 Federal Census 1920, Frederick Ruple Batesville, independence, Arkansas. Married. Source Ancestry. com 1920 United States Federal Census Place Batesville, Independence, Arkansas; Roll: T625_66; Page: 4B; Enumeration District: 40; Image: 400.
 Federal Census 1930, Frederick Ruple Fayetteville, Washington, Arkansas. Married. Source Ancestry. com 1930 United States Federal Census Place Fayetteville, Washington, Arkansas; Roll: 97; Page: 18B; Enumeration District: 22; Image 620.0; FHL microfilm: 2339832.

Other references 
 Fort Smith Public Library www.fortsmithlibrary.org
 Genealogy Bank
 Grace Keith Genealogical Collection, Fayetteville Public Library
 Hattiesburg American, Mississippi, Saturday, March 25, 1961
 Encyclopedia of Arkansas
 http://www.fotorevers.eu/de/fotograf/Gassler/2269/
 Ohio, Marriages 1803-1900, Jordan Dodd, Liahona Research, (database on-line), Provo, UT, USA: Ancestry.com Operations Inc., 2001.
 Oklahoma Historical Society
 Northwest Arkansas Times, Fayetteville, Ark., Wed. May 25, 1938, Funeral Home Records of Tulsa, Oklahoma by Tulsa City- County Library Research Center, 400 Civic Center, Tulsa, Ok 74103
 Ruppl school
 South West American, May 25, 1938, Frederick Ruple will be Buried here Wednesday.
 State Archives of Basel-City, [www.staatsarchiv.bs.ch Präsidialdepartement]
 State Archives Schaffhausen, Switzerland  www.staatsarchiv.sh.ch/
 The Daily Oklahoman
 THE INDEPENDENCE COUNTY CHRONICLE Vol. X1X, Number 4, July 1978 of Independence County Historical Society
 The murals in the capital building Little Rock Ar. Source accessed Research Center, Tulsa City-County Library, RCAskUs@tulsalibrary.org, and material taken from The Encyclopedia of Arkansas History & Culture, “Paul Martin Heerwagen” by W. Russ Aikman, University of Texas at Austin.
 The Oklahoman (1889- ), Date: March 20, 1932, p: 18 and December 3, 1932, front page
 Tulsa Daily News, May 25, 1938
 Tulsa Daily World, Sunday, March 20, 1932, and May 24, 1938, page 3
 www.Newspaperarchives.com
 Chronicling America
 Fayetteville daily Democrat. (Fayetteville, Ark.) 1920-1937, Tuesday, Nov. 1932 Page six  (personal Mentiou) Guets at Capt. And Mrs L.Y. Hartman

1871 births
1938 deaths
American portrait painters
Swiss emigrants to the United States